Family Groove Company is an unsigned American four piece jam band based out of Chicago, Illinois.  FGC tours heavily and as of June 2006, they have played in 28 states totaling over 400 shows.

History
Family Groove Company (FGC) started out in January 2001 when Adam Lewis (guitar) and Jordan Wilkow (keyboards) met Janis Wallin (bass) and Mattias Blanck (drums) while studying music at the Musician's Institute in Los Angeles, California.  It wasn't long before they recorded their first demo recording and began performing throughout Southern California. The band began touring quite a bit throughout the Western U.S. with regular appearances in San Diego, San Francisco, and Portland, Oregon.  In Spring 2002, the band released their 10-track debut album, Reachin'.

With the number of markets available to the band limited by the vast expanse of the American west, in the fall of 2002, FGC made the decision to relocate to Chicago, Illinois.  Since then, the band has pursued an aggressive touring schedule that has included headlining performances, "opening band" exposure opportunities, and high-profile appearances at festivals like Summerfest, the 10,000 Lakes Festival, and Summer Camp Music Festival in Chillicothe, IL.

After playing almost 400 more shows and adding over 50 songs to their playlists since their first release, FGC released their second studio album, The Charmer, on April 25, 2006.  The Charmer was recorded at Studio Chicago, in Chicago, Illinois in December 2005 with overdubs in January and February 2006.  All that touring produced numerous songs.  In all, fourteen songs made the cut and are on the album.

The music
Family Groove Company integrates the groove sensibility developed by James Brown and Herbie Hancock, with the more traditional song structure and consciousness of the hook revolutionized by the Beatles. FGC has avoided the jam band formula of the hip-hop/funk/rock groove combined with endless guitar solos.  Their focus has been to supplement their passion for improvisation with an attentiveness to composition.  FGC feels that compositional coherence and ingenuity are every bit as important as the "jam" that has come to be the namesake of their genre.

Discography
Reachin' (2002)
The Charmer (2006)
Models and Metrics (2008)
Live in Chicago (2008)
Through with Tomorrow (2020)

References

External links
Family Groove Company (official site)
Family Groove Company collection at the Internet Archive's live music archive

Rock music groups from Illinois
Jam bands
Musical groups from Chicago